Johnnycake is a flatbread.

Johnnycake may also refer to:

Johnnycake, West Virginia
Johnnycake Town
Johnny Cakes (The Sopranos)